Ashley Allanson (born 13 November 1986) is a footballer, who plays in midfield at Bridlington Town.

His previous clubs include Hull City, Scunthorpe United and Farsley Celtic. Allanson had two loan spells at Farsley before making the deal permanent before the 2007–08 season. After making 15 appearances during the 2007–08 season he was released and joined Bridlington Town. He played against Farsley in a pre-season friendly in which his new team lost 6–0. Ashley has played for the England Futsal team and the England Universities 11-a-side team. He is a coach at the Hull City Centre of Excellence and holds a UEFA B football coaching badge.

External links

https://web.archive.org/web/20070928070724/http://www.bridtownafc.co.uk/

1986 births
Living people
Footballers from Kingston upon Hull
English footballers
Association football forwards
Hull City A.F.C. players
Scunthorpe United F.C. players
Farsley Celtic A.F.C. players
English Football League players
National League (English football) players
Bridlington Town A.F.C. players
Association football midfielders
English men's futsal players
Association football coaches